The Lapp knot is an ends joint, i.e. it is used to join two cordage ends (whether of separate lines or of one, making a round sling). It is essentially a reverse sheet bend. The slipped Lapp bend also is an exploding knot, which means that when pulling the quick release end it falls completely apart without further entanglement. It is as strong as or even stronger than the sheet bend, though much less common.

The Lapp knot is closely related to the sheet bend, the bowline and the Eskimo bowline, as they all share the same core structure, but differ in how the four ends are loaded --which is standing part, tail, eye legs, as applicable.
The Lapp knot was sometimes called 'false sheet bend', which might explain its low popularity.

Lapp bend

A way to tie the knot is shown in the image to the left. The orientation of the green bight is important: Its working end should end up on the same side as the red lines slip bight, or as the red working end when tying the non-slip version (A & C). If they end up on opposite sides (B & C), the resulting knot is much weaker and tends to slip, because then the two standing parts lose some of their binding force due to mutual friction before they can clamp down the loose ends. (The same is true for the bowline.)

The non-slipped Lapp bend (like the bowline) does not jam and can be untied easily even after being loaded. The slipped version unties even easier with a firm tug on the end E (quick release).

Lapp knot as loop
The Lapp knot can be tied as an eye knot, in which case the result is known commonly as the Eskimo Bowline (see
Eskimo_bowline).

Lapp knot as (adjustable) binding knot
The slipped Lapp knot can also be used as a binding knot for bundles or rolls (or a bathrobe). Its advantage over the reef knot is that the finished knot can be tightened by pulling the slip loop and end (C+E) and the working end A in opposite directions, or loosened by pulling B instead of A. When releasing C+E, it pulls tight again. Pulling only end E dissolves it completely.

History
The knot is documented since 1892 under various names (false weaver's bend, false sheet bend, English Bowline, Girdle Knot), and was used by various native cultures (America, Lapland, Africa, Australia). The name Lap(p) knot stems from it having been used in Lapland to tie reindeer to a sled and for lanyards. The slipped Lapp knot is also shown in The Ashley Book of Knots as #1224, a nameless decorative bathrobe cord knot.

Alternatives
 An obvious alternative is the much more common sheet bend (though probably not better). 
 See List of bend knots.
As a loop:
 obviously the bowline, cowboy bowline
 See List of loop knots
As a binding knot:
 The reef knot is much more common, but not adjustable.
 A rolling hitch tied around the other end can also be used as an adjustable binding knot.
 The constrictor knot can be much tighter, but needs more rope and unties less easy.

References

External links
 Youtube: Tying the Lapp bend
 Youtube: Untying compared to the bowline
 Youtube: Use as adjustable binding knot and different way of tying

Knots